Marc William Buie (born 1958) is an American astronomer and prolific discoverer of minor planets who works at the Southwest Research Institute  in Boulder, Colorado in the Space Science Department. Formerly he worked at the Lowell Observatory in Flagstaff, Arizona, and was the Sentinel Space Telescope Mission Scientist for the B612 Foundation, which is dedicated to protecting Earth from asteroid impact events.

Early life and education 
Buie grew up in Baton Rouge, Louisiana, and received his B.Sc. in physics from Louisiana State University in 1980. He then switched fields and earned his Ph.D. in Planetary Science from the University of Arizona in 1984. Buie was a post-doctoral fellow at the University of Hawaii from 1985 to 1988. From 1988 to 1991, he worked at the Space Telescope Science Institute where he played a key role in the planning and scheduling of the first planetary observations ever made by the Hubble Space Telescope. Buie joined the staff at Lowell Observatory in 1991.

Career 

Since 1983, Pluto has been a central theme of research done by Buie, who has published over 85 scientific papers and journal articles. His first result was to prove that the methane visible on Pluto was on its surface and not part of its atmosphere. Since then he has worked on albedo maps of the surface, composition maps of Pluto and Charon, refinement of the orbits of Charon in addition to the much more recently discovered satellites, measurements of the structure of the atmosphere, and other measurements of the properties of the surfaces of Pluto and Charon—just to name a few. He is also one of the co-discoverers of Pluto's moons, Nix and Hydra.

He has been working with the Deep Ecliptic Survey team who have been responsible for the discovery of over 1,000 Kuiper belt objects (KBOs). Beyond the work of just locating these objects, he additionally seeks to develop a better picture of the structure and nature of them. A spin-off project from this endeavor was his participation in the project to locate a Kuiper belt object that was within the range of NASA's New Horizons mission after it passed by Pluto. This search led to the discovery of over 50 new KBOs, including 486958 Arrokoth, the object that New Horizons would eventually perform a close fly-by of on 1 January 2019. In the lead up to the fly-by, Buie also led a successful occultation campaign in Argentina and South Africa to observe Arrokoth as it passed in front of a distant star to refine the estimates of its size, shape, and orbit. Jim Green, NASA's director of planetary science at the time, called the effort "the most historic occultation on the face of the Earth."

In addition to his research into all aspects of Pluto and the Kuiper belt, Buie also works on studying transitional objects like 2060 Chiron and 5145 Pholus and occasionally comets, such as the recent Deep impact mission that went to Comet Tempel 1. In an effort closer to home, he also studies near-Earth asteroids to try to understand more about these potentially dangerous solar system neighbors. Most of these research efforts involve the use of Lowell Observatory telescopes in addition to occasional use of the Hubble and Spitzer Space Telescopes. He is also active in the development of state-of-the-art astronomical instrumentation having just completed the construction of an infrared imaging spectrograph, Mimir, in collaboration with Dan Clemens of Boston University.

Buie is a member of the American Astronomical Society (AAS) and its Division for Planetary Sciences (DPS), the American Geophysical Union (AGU), the International Astronomical Union (IAU), and the International Dark-Sky Association.

The inner main-belt asteroid 7553 Buie was named in the astronomer's honor on 28 July 1999. He is also profiled as part of an article on Pluto in Air & Space Smithsonian magazine.

List of discovered minor planets

References

External links 

 From the desk of Marc W. Buie page from Lowell 
 Portrait of Marc Buie by Dan Coogan

1958 births
20th-century American astronomers
21st-century American astronomers

Discoverers of asteroids
Discoverers of trans-Neptunian objects
Living people
Louisiana State University alumni
New Horizons
Planetary scientists
Date of birth missing (living people)